Motorway 6 or Attica Motorway or Attiki Odos  (Greek: Αττική Οδός) is a privately owned toll motorway in Greece, part of the Attiki Odos system. Connecting Eleusis in the west with the Athens International Airport in the east, it forms the northern beltway of Athens.

History 
Construction of the motorway began in 1996. Part of the motorway was opened along with the Eleftherios Venizelos International Airport to which it connects, in 2001. It started from the Gerakas interchange and led to the airport.

In September 2002, construction of the Athens Suburban Railway railway started, in the large median of the motorway. The railway was opened in 2004. In early 2003, the A6 was opened from the Kifisias Avenue Interchange to Eleftherios Venizelos Airport. In November 2003, the western part opened from the junction with the A8 to Kifisias Avenue.

Tolls 
Toll stations are located at the interchanges leading to the Attiki Odos motorway and the toll fare is paid when entering the motorway. The fare is the same regardless of the length of journey but depends on vehicle category. Drivers can pay either by cash, e-pass or a special account card; for motorbikes and cars the standard toll fares are €1.40 and €2.80 respectively.

Exit list 

The exits of the A6 motorway:

References

External links 
 The official website of Attiki Odos S.A.
 Previous projects on Attiki Odos

Motorways in Greece
Toll roads in Greece
Ring roads in Greece
Buildings and structures in Athens
Transport in Athens
Roads in Attica